U-27 class submarine may refer to:

 U-27-class submarine (Austria-Hungary), a class of eight boats based on the German Type UB II submarine and built 1916–1917
 U-27-class submarine (Germany), a class of four boats built 1913